Gailbach may refer to:

Gailbach (Blies), a river of Moselle, France and Saarland, Germany, tributary of the Blies
Gailbach (Drava), a river of East Tyrol, Austria, tributary the Drava
Gailbach, a district of the town Aschaffenburg, Bavaria, Germany